Ibex is an unincorporated community within Elliott County, Kentucky, United States.

A post office was established in the community in 1890.  Ibex was named from the animal of the same name by its first postmaster.

References

Unincorporated communities in Elliott County, Kentucky
Unincorporated communities in Kentucky